Mondot may refer to:
Mondot, a village in the Aínsa-Sobrarbe municipality, Aragon
Château Troplong Mondot, a Bordeaux wine from the appellation Saint-Émilion